PITSLRE serine/threonine-protein kinase CDC2L2 is an enzyme that in humans is encoded by the CDC2L2 gene.

References

External links

Further reading